Arnica griscomii is an Asian and North American species of plants in the sunflower family, known by the common name snow arnica. It is native to eastern Russia and northwestern North America (Alaska, British Columbia, Yukon, Northwest Territories) and to eastern Canada (Quebec and Newfoundland).

Subspecies
 Arnica griscomii subsp. frigida (C.A.Mey. ex Iljin) S.J.Wolf - Alaska, western Canada, eastern Russia
 Arnica griscomii subsp. griscomii - Quebec and Newfoundland

References

External links
Alaska Wildflowers
Paul Slichter, The Sunflower Family in Denali National Park and Preserve,  Frigid Arnica, Snow Arnica Arnica griscomii ssp. frigida

griscomii
Flora of Subarctic America
Flora of Russia
Plants described in 1924
Flora of Eastern Canada